True to Life is a 1977 studio album by American recording artist Ray Charles. It marked Ray's return to Atlantic Records.  The album contains cover versions, most notably Johnny Nash's "I Can See Clearly Now", Bobby Charles' "The Jealous Kind", George and Ira Gershwin's "How Long Has This Been Going On?", and The Beatles' "Let It Be". The album was arranged by Larry Muhoberac, Roger Newman, Sid Feller and Ray Charles.

Track listing
"I Can See Clearly Now" (Johnny Nash) – 4:22
"The Jealous Kind" (Robert Guidry) – 4:38
"Oh, What a Beautiful Mornin'" (Oscar Hammerstein II, Richard Rodgers) – 4:30
"How Long Has This Been Going On?" (George Gershwin, Ira Gershwin) –- 5:07
"Be My Love" (Nicholas Brodsky, Sammy Cahn) – 4:19
"Anonymous Love" (Edward Langford, Joel Webster) – 4:36
"Heavenly Music" (Bob Bradstreet, Solomon Burke) – 3:38
"Game Number Nine" (Dee Ervin, Tommy Payton) – 4:07
"Let It Be" (John Lennon, Paul McCartney) – 3:27

Personnel 
Credits for True to Life adapted from Allmusic.

 Ray Charles – arranger, engineer, keyboards, piano, producer, vocals
 Sid Feller – arranger
 Bob Gratts – engineer
 Robert Gratts – engineer
 Larry Muhoberac – arranger
 Roger Newman – arranger

Notes

References
 Atlantic 19142
 [ True to Life] at Allmusic.com

External links 
 True to Life at Discogs

1977 albums
Ray Charles albums
Albums arranged by Sid Feller
Albums arranged by Larry Muhoberac
Albums produced by Ray Charles
Atlantic Records albums